Popular tourist attractions in Macau include the following:

Buildings and towers
 Macau Tower

Casinos
 Altira Macau 
 Casino Lisboa
 City of Dreams
 Galaxy Macau
 L'Arc Casino
 MGM Macau
 Ponte 16
 Pousada Marina Infante
 Sands Macao
 The Venetian Macao
 Wynn Macau

Historical buildings
 Camões Grotto
 Dom Pedro V Theatre
 Fortaleza do Monte
 Guia Fortress
 Holy House of Mercy
 Leal Senado Building
 Lou Kau Mansion
 Macau General Post Office
 Mong-Há Fort
 Portas do Cerco
 Ruins of St. Paul's
 Santa Casa de Misericórdia
 Walls of Macau

Libraries
 Archives of Macao
 Sir Robert Ho Tung Library

Museums

 Communications Museum
 Grand Prix Museum
 Handover Gifts Museum of Macao
 Macau Museum of Art
 Macau Wine Museum
 Maritime Museum
 Museum of Macau
 Museum of Sacred Art and Crypt
 Museum of Taipa and Coloane History
 Sun Yat Sen Memorial House
 Taipa Houses–Museum

Nature
 Hac Sa Beach
 Nam Van Lake
 Sai Van Lake

Parks and gardens
 Casa Garden
 Coloane Park
 Comendador Ho Yin Garden
 Dr Carlos d'Assumpcao Park
 Montanha Russa Park
 Arts Garden
 Hac Sa Park
 Lou Lim Ieoc Garden
 Seac Pai Van Park
 Sun Yat Sen Park
 Vasco da Gama Garden
 Victory Garden

Public squares
 Lotus Square
 Senado Square
 Tap Seac Square

Religious places
 A-Ma Temple
 Kuan Tai Temple
 Macau Mosque and Cemetery
 Macau Protestant Chapel
 Na Tcha Temple
 Our Lady of Fátima Church
 Sé Church
 St. Dominic's Church
 St. Joseph's Seminary and Church
 St. Lazarus' Church

Science centers
 Macao Science Center

Shopping centers
 Red Market (building)

Sport centers
 Caesars Golf Macau
 Macau East Asian Games Dome
 Macau Olympic Aquatic Centre
 Macau University of Science and Technology Sports Field
 Tap Seac Multi-sports Pavilion

Theme parks
 Macau Fisherman's Wharf
 Macao Giant Panda Pavilion

Others
 Macau Design Centre

Transportation
 Cable Guia
 Macau International Airport
 Outer Harbour Ferry Terminal

See also
 Tourism in Macau

Tourism in Macau
Macau
Macau